The Women's 500 m time trial competition at the 2022 UCI Track Cycling World Championships will be held on 15 October 2022.

Results

Qualifying
The qualifying was started at 12:00. The top eight riders qualified for the final.

Final
The final was started at 17:30.

References

Women's 500 m time trial